A Hero of Our Time is a 1840 novel by Mikhail Lermontov.

It may also refer to:
 A Hero of Our Time (Pratolini novel), 1947 novel by Vasco Pratolini
 A Hero of Our Times, 1955 Italian comedy film by Mario Monicelli
 , 1960 Italian film by  starring Marina Berti, adapted from the Pratolini novel
 Hero of Our Time (film), 1966 Soviet drama film directed by Stanislav Rostotsky, adapted from the Lermontov novel
 Hero of Our Time, 1996 album by Swedish punk rock band Satanic Surfers
 , 2006 Russian 8-episode series by Alexander Kott, adapted from the Lermontov novel